The Men's individual compound open is one of the events held in archery at the 2012 Summer Paralympics in London.

W1

Ranking round

Competition bracket

Finals

Section 1

Section 2

Open

Ranking round

Competition bracket

Finals

Section 1

Section 2

Section 3

Section 4

References 

M